Matthew Passmore (born 24 December 1973) is an Australian actor.  He is known for McLeod's Daughters (2006–2009), Blue Heelers (2003), Last Man Standing (2005), and his first American television show, The Glades (2010–2013).

Career

Television
Passmore began his career on the children's television series Play School. Later on, he took on a variety of roles on Australian television shows such as Always Greener, Blue Heelers, The Cooks, Last Man Standing, McLeod's Daughters, and Underbelly: Tale of Two Cities. Passmore also starred in USA Network's Satisfaction.

Filmography

Film

Television

References

External links
  (archive)
 

1973 births
Australian male film actors
Australian male television actors
Australian children's television presenters
Living people
People from Brisbane